The following is a list of New Zealand film directors and producers.

 Andrew Adamson 
 Barry Barclay - produced the first feature made by an indigenous person anywhere in the world.
Pietra Brettkelly - award winning documentary filmmaker, part of The Academy of Motion Pictures Arts and Sciences and was recently named an Arts Laureate of New Zealand
 Martin Campbell 
 Jane Campion 
Winston Cowie
 Niki Caro
 Max Currie
 Roger Donaldson  (born in Australia)
 Cameron Duncan
 Toa Fraser
 Alex Galvin
 Ben Hawker
 Jason Lei Howden
 Rudall Hayward - pioneer filmmaker
 Sir Peter Jackson 
 Christine Jeffs
 Rupert Julian aka Percival Hayes -  New Zealand’s first Hollywood actor, director during the Silent Era
 Paul Maunder
 Brad McGann
 Danny Mulheron
 Geoff Murphy 
 Andrew Niccol - film director, screenwriter
 John O'Shea
 April Phillips
 Gaylene Preston
 Christian Rivers
 James Napier Robertson
 Robert Sarkies
 David Sims
 Jason Stutter
 Lee Tamahori 
 Taika Waititi (Taika Cohen)
 Vincent Ward 
 Peter Wells - author and film director
 Mika X

References

Lists of film directors by nationality
Directors
 
Directors